Adrar is a large administrative region in Mauritania, named for the Adrar Plateau. The capital is Atar. Other major towns include Choum, Chinguetti and Ouadane. The region borders Western Sahara and the Mauritanian region of Tiris Zemmour to the north, Mali and the Mauritanian region of Hodh Ech Chargui to the east, the Mauritanian regions of Trarza and Tagant to the south and the Mauritanian region of Inchiri to the west.

As of 2013, the population of the region was 62,658, compared to 77,812 in 2011. There were 49.19 per cent females and 50.81 per cent males. As of 2008, the literacy rate for people aged 15 years and over was 50.30%.  The total net enrolment ratio at secondary level was 7.10%. As of 2008, the activity rate was 48.20% and economic dependency ratio was 0.84.

Demographics

As of 2013, the population of the region was 62,658, compared to 77,812 in 2011. There were 49.19% females and 50.81% males. As of 2008, the activity rate was 48.20 and economic dependency ratio was 0.84. The fraction of people working in government was 19.20%, individual / household private was 12.60%, other was 61.00%, para public was 2.60%, and private enterprise was 4.60%. The Grand Total as of 2008 was 737.74. As of 2007, the number of tourist establishments in the region was 5. As of 2008, the Couples with children was 37.30 and Couples without children was 3.10. The proportion with extended family was 26.00% and extended single-parent was 12.10%, one-person was 6.60%, and single-parent nuclear was 15.00%.

Economy and health
As of 2008, the literacy rate for people aged 15 years and over was 50.30.  The net enrollment ratio of girls for secondary level was 7.00 per cent, net enrollment ratio of boys for secondary level was 7.20 per cent, and total net enrollment ratio at secondary level was 7.10 per cent. As of 2013, the coverage rate of DPT3 Children From 0 to 11 Months in the region was 49.80 per cent, BGC vaccination was 52.60 and polio vaccination coverage was 49.80. As of 2008, the rate of household confirming the existence of public telephone in their neighbourhood or village was 69.24,  rate of households benefiting from electricity post in their neighbourhood was 3.08 per cent, rate of households benefiting from health centre or health post in their neighbourhood was 2.29 per cent, and rate of households receiving the services public telephone was 2.68 per cent.

Geography

Mauritania is mostly covered with desert, with only its western regions around the coast of Atlantic Ocean having some vegetation. There are some oasis in the desert regions. Since it is a desert, there are large shifting dunes forming temporary ranges. Due to the geography, the inhabitants historically, have been nomadic. In modern times, people have migrated to urban centres during the drought in 1970 and 1980. There are a few sedentary cultivators, who are located only in the Southern regions of the country.

Local administration

The local administration is adopted from French local administration framework with a Ministry of Internal Control governing the local bodies. The original administration was held by Governors of each district, but after the municipal elections in 1994, the powers has been decentralized from the district bodies. Mauritania has been divided into 13 wilayas (regions), including the Nouakchott Capital District. The smallest administrative division in the country is the commune and the country has 216 of them. A group of communes form a moughataa (department) and the group of moughataa form a district. There are total of 53 moughataa for the 13 districts in the country. The executive power of the district is vested on a district chief,  while it is on hakem for moughataa.  Out of the 216 communes, 53 classified as urban and rest 163 are rural. The communes are responsible for overseeing and coordinating development activities and are financed by the state. The Local Governments have their own legal jurisdiction, financial autonomy, an annual budget, staff, and an office. The elections for the local government are conducted every five years along with Senate and Parliamentary elections. On account of the political instability, the last elections were held in 2006. Adrar is divided into four departments, namely, Aoujeft Department, Atar Department, Chinguetti Department and Ouadane Department.

See also

Regions of Mauritania
Departments of Mauritania

References

External links 
 

 
Regions of Mauritania